Highland Mary is a song composed in 1792 by Scottish poet Robert Burns.  It is one of three works dedicated to Mary Campbell, with whom Burns was in love in the 1780s. The others, "Highland Lassie, O" and "Will Ye Go to the Indies My Mary?", were composed in 1786. "Highland Mary" consists of four stanzas that speak of Burns's affection for the lady, his melancholy at her death and his continued memory of her. The melody was that of "Katherine Ogie."

The poem
Ye banks, and braes, and streams around
The castle o' Montgomery,
Green be your woods, and fair your flowers,
Your waters never drumlie!
There simmer first unfauld her robes,
And there the langest tarry;
For there I took the last Fareweel
O' my sweet Highland Mary.

How sweetly bloom'd the gay green birk!
How rich the hawthorn's blossom!
As underneath their fragrant shade,
I clasp'd her to my bosom!
The golden hours, on angel wings,
Flew o'er me and my dearie;
For dear to me, as light and life,
Was my sweet Highland Mary!

Wi' mony a vow, and lock'd embrace,
Our parting was fu' tender;
And, pledging aft to meet again,
We tore oursel's asunder;
But, oh! fell Death's untimely frost,
That nipt my flower sae early! -
Now green's the sod, and cauld's the clay,
That wraps my Highland Mary!

O pale, pale now, those rosy lips,
I aft hae kiss'd sae fondly!
And clos'd for aye the sparkling glance
That dwelt on me sae kindly!
And mouldering now in silent dust,
That heart that lo'ed me dearly -
But still within my bosom's core
Shall live my Highland Mary!

Gallery

References

External links
 Highland Mary on BBC Scotland (with audio recording)
 Highland Mary at robertburns.org

1792 songs
Scottish songs
Songs with lyrics by Robert Burns